Sean R. Cutler is a professor of plant cell biology at the University of California, Riverside. In 2009 Cutler showed how abscisic acid, a naturally-produced plant stress hormone, helps plants survive by inhibiting their growth in times of drought. Cutler also discovered pyrabactin, a synthetic chemical that mimics abscisic acid. His research was named by Science magazine as one of the top 10 breakthroughs of the year. In 2018, he was elected to the National Academy of Sciences.

Cutler received his B.A. and M.S. from the University of Toronto, and his Ph.D. from Stanford University.

He is a member of the Editorial Board for PNAS.

References

External links
 Sean Cutler - UCR website
 Imagine there’s no hunger... It’s easy if you try (University of California)
 Organic compound comes to the aid of thirsty plants, Royal Society of Chemistry, 01 May 2009
 What if Scientists Didn’t Compete? (New York Times article on Cutler, April 30, 2009)

University of California, Riverside faculty
University of Toronto alumni
Stanford University alumni
Living people
Year of birth missing (living people)
Place of birth missing (living people)